Elizabeth Fischer Monastero is an American operatic mezzo-soprano and voice teacher.

Life and career
Born Elizabeth Fischer and raised in Dubuque, Iowa, Fischer Monastero graduated with a bachelor's degree in vocal performance from the University of Michigan in 1956. She also studied with tenor Richard Miller at the Interlochen Center for the Arts and with Clara Bloomfield of Elkhart Lake, Wisconsin.

In 1962 Fischer Monastero won the Euclid McBride Memorial Scholarship in the finals of the Metropolitan Opera National Council Auditions. That same year she won the American Opera Auditions which enabled her to study opera in Italy. Before leaving for Italy, she attended the Music Academy of the West's summer conservatory. Shortly after she made her European debut at the Teatro Nuovo in Milan in September 1962 as Suzuki in Giacomo Puccini's Madama Butterfly; a role which she repeated that year at the Teatro Comunale Florence.

Fischer Monastero made her debut at the Lyric Opera of Chicago in October 1962 as the Shepherd Boy in Tosca with Régine Crespin in the title role. She appeared in several more roles with the company over the next three seasons, including Giovanna in Rigoletto and Kate Pinkerton in Madama Butterfly among other roles. In 1963 she won the National Federation of Music Clubs' Vocal Competition which led to her invitation to perform at the White House for First Lady Jacqueline Kennedy and other dignitaries with members of the National Symphony Orchestra.

While working at the Lyric Opera of Chicago, Fischer Monastero met her husband, Salvatore Monastero, a successful Chicago restaurateur who was also a member of the Lyric opera chorus. Together they founded the Chicago Bel Canto Foundation; an organization which operates an international singing competition whose prize affords winners the opportunities to study opera in Italy with important artists. Past teachers associated with the organization include opera legends Tito Gobbi, Carlo Bergonzi, and Renata Tebaldi. The couple have four children and several grandchildren together.

In 1973 Fischer Monastero joined the voice faculty at Northwestern University where she taught for more than 30 years. Her pupils include baritone Victor Benedetti, mezzo-soprano Edyta Kulczak, contralto Helen Tintes-Schuermann and sopranos Dara Hobbs and Maria Russo among others.

References

American opera singers
Northwestern University faculty
Operatic mezzo-sopranos
Musicians from Milwaukee
University of Michigan School of Music, Theatre & Dance alumni
Voice teachers
Winners of the Metropolitan Opera National Council Auditions
Living people
Place of birth missing (living people)
Year of birth missing (living people)
Classical musicians from Wisconsin
Music Academy of the West alumni